The 2008 European Karate Championships, the 43rd edition, were held at the Saku Suurhall in Tallinn, Estonia from 2 May to 4 2008. A total of 509 karateka, 329 male and 180 female athletes, from 42 countries participated at the event.

Participating countries

Medallists

Men's competition

Individual

Team

Women's competition

Individual

Team

Medal table

References

External links
 Karate Records – European Championship 2008

2008
International sports competitions hosted by Estonia
European Karate Championships
European championships in 2008
Sports competitions in Tallinn
21st century in Tallinn
Karate competitions in Estonia
May 2008 sports events in Europe